Theodosia can refer to:

People
Theodosia of Tyre, 3rd century Christian martyr
Theodosia of Constantinople, 7th–8th century Byzantine nun, martyr and saint of the Eastern Orthodox Church
Theodosia, wife of Leo V (c. 775–c. 826), Empress consort of Leo V the Armenian
Theda Bara (1885–1955), stage name of actress Theodosia Burr Goodman
Theodosia Burr Alston (1783–1813), daughter of U.S. Vice President Aaron Burr
Theodosia Burr Shepherd (1845-1906), American botanist
Theodosia Ann Dean (1819-1843), English missionary
Theodosia Harris (1877-1938), American screenwriter
Theodosia Ivie or Ivy (1629-1697), English adventuress
Theodosia Meade, Countess of Clanwilliam (1744–1817)
Theodosia Ntokou, classical pianist
Theodosia Okoh, Ghanaian stateswoman and teacher known for designing the national flag of Ghana
Anne Steele (1717-1778), English poet and hymn writer who published under the pseudonym Theodosia
Theodosia Stirling (1815-1904), Australian actor and singer

Places
Feodosiya, sometimes spelled Theodosia or Feodosia, a city in Crimea (currently disputed between Ukraine and Russia)
Feodosiya municipality
Theodosia, Missouri, a village in the USA
Theodosia Inlet, an inlet in the South Coast region of British Columbia, Canada
the Theodosia River, a river feeding that inlet
Dumbarton in Scotland, which was given the name Theodosia in the highly-successful forgery De Situ Britanniae

Animals 
 Theodosia (beetle), a genus of beetles

Name 
 Theodosia (given name), the given name.

Ships

Fictional characters
Theodosia Burr Alston, in the book My Theodosia by Anya Seton 
Theodosia Throckmorton, main character in Theodosia and the Serpents of Chaos, a children's novel by R.L. LaFevers
The television series based on the novel, Theodosia
Theodosia, from the play The Royal Master by James Shirley

See also
Theodora (disambiguation)
"Dear Theodosia", a song from the musical Hamilton